Köln is a 2015 jazz album by Marshall Gilkes and the WDR Big Band. It earned the artists a nomination for the Grammy Award for Best Large Jazz Ensemble Album.

Track listing

Source: Allmusic

References

2015 albums